Ng Wee Tai Colin is a Singaporean yachtsman best known for winning a gold medal in the 13th Asian Games held in Bangkok, Thailand.

Ng partnered Siew Shaw Her in the 13th Asian Games to win the International 420 class. In 1993, won Gold with Anthony Kiong in the 420 class at the SEA Games. In 1997, he partnered with Khor Teck Lin to win the International 420 class in the 1997 Southeast Asian Games held in Jakarta, Indonesia. 
In 2015, he sailed to a Gold and Silver medal at the 2015 SEA Games in the Men's keelboat.
To date - 1 Asian Games Gold, 3 SEA Games Gold medals and 3 Silver medal.
He was inducted in the Singapore Sports Hall of Fame together with Siew in 1999.

References

Living people
Singaporean male sailors (sport)
Year of birth missing (living people)
Asian Games medalists in sailing
Sailors at the 1998 Asian Games
Sailors at the 2010 Asian Games
Asian Games gold medalists for Singapore
Medalists at the 1998 Asian Games
Southeast Asian Games medalists in sailing
Southeast Asian Games gold medalists for Singapore
Competitors at the 1997 Southeast Asian Games
Competitors at the 2019 Southeast Asian Games
Southeast Asian Games silver medalists for Singapore